The Srimad Bhagavata is one of the main books of Hindu philosophy. The Bhagavata is a devotional account of the Supreme Being and His incarnations. Book 1 of the Srimad Bhagavata discusses the origin of the Bhagavata, and introduces the reader to the glories of Krishna as the Supreme Lord. This book consists of 19 chapters. The Bhagavata is authored by Veda Vyasa and the source material for this summary is the translation presented by Swami Tapasyananda. Additional material and analysis is included.

Chapter 1
	Introduction and background of the Bhagavata.
	The Bhagavata is told by Suta to Saunaka Muni and others at Naimisaranya.
	Purposes of reading the Bhagavata presented as questions
	Purification by listening to the glories of Narayana.
	Enjoying reading about Narayan's Avtars.
	Dharma during Kaliyuga is devotion.

Chapter 2
	The importance of Bhakti (devotion) as it is the best path to the Supreme 
	Deconstruction of worldly reasoning and progress – frenzied activity leads to confusion while devotion leads to peace.
	Devotion leads to supreme peace and happiness.
	People worship based on their own thinking, desires, understanding
	Worship of Krishna as the Supreme Being brings infinite benefits.
	Worshippers of Pitris (Ancestors), and elemental powers get the finite rewards they seek (such as wealth and power)
	These rewards ultimately come from Krishna alone.

Chapter 3
	First Avatar (Incarnation) of the Supreme Lord is the Purushavtara, as the form of the entire universe that is created and destroyed
	23 Other Main Avtars – Sanka and the Kumaras, Cosmic Boar, Devarishi Narada, Rishis Nara and Narayana, Kapila, Dattatreya, Yajna, Rishabha, emperor Prithu, Divine Fish, Tortoise, Dhanvantari, Mohini, Nrisimha (Man-Lion), Vamana, Parasurama, Veda-Vyasa, Ramachandra, Balarama and Krishna, Buddha, Kalki
	There are an infinite number of Avtars
	Krishna is referred to as the ‘complete’ Avatar
	The Supreme Being creates and destroys the universe, but is not affected by the process of creation and dissolution.
	Maharishi Veda Vyasa wrote the Bhagavata 
	Vyasa taught the Bhagavata to Shuka Rishi (Vyasa's son)
	Shuka Rishi taught the Bhagavata to King Parikshit, where the Suta listened
	This version is the Suta's narration

Chapter 4
	Illustration of the spiritual greatness of Suka Rishi 
	Vyasa re-edited the Vedas for people to understand during Kaliyuga
	Vyasa wrote the Mahabharata to teach people the lessons of the Vedas
	The Mahabharata covers Dharma, Artha, Kama, and Moksha, but does not cover Bhakti (devotion).
	Even after composing the Mahabharata (with 125,000 verses), Vyasa still felt unsatisfied. Vyasa guessed that this was because the Mahabharata did not cover the devotional aspects of Krishna.
	Narada arrives at Vyasa's Ashram.

Chapter 5
	Narada explains that Vyasa feels incomplete because of not writing about Bhakti (devotion) and the glories of the Supreme Lord and His incarnations.
	Narada describes the importance of Bhakti as the easiest and best path to the Supreme and the best way to escape from the pitfalls of Samsara (worldly life).
	Story of Narada before reaching the status of Devarishi Narada
	Highlights the importance of serving Holy Men in order to develop Bhakti.
	Narada describes that even though action (Karma) is usually a cause of bondage, Karma dedicated to God leads to Bhakti.

Chapter 6
	Continuation of Narada's story (of his previous life)
	After Narada's mother suddenly died, Narada turned completely to spirituality, but was unable to see Vishnu in that form
	Narada was reborn as Devarishi Narada in the current Kalpa (cycle of creation)
	Devarishi Narada travels the universe singing Narayana's praises

Chapter 7
	Vyasa enters into Samadhi and realized that Bhakti is the easiest way to eliminate the sufferings of Avidya (ignorance of the spiritual Truth) and achieve spiritual bliss
	Vyasa wrote the Bhagavata Purana
	Even though Suka Rishi was already fully absorbed in the abstract Self, Devarishi Vyasa taught the Bhagavata to his son, Suka Rishi
	At the end of the Mahabharata war, Ashwattama (one of Duryodhana's allies) tried to destroy the victorious Pandavas. However, Ashwattama accidentally killed the Upa-Pandavas (the 5 children the Pandavas had by Draupadi). 
	Arjuna captures Ashwattama, but is reluctant to kill Him, as Ashwattama is the son of Drona (the teacher of the Pandavas) and Draupadi does not want Drona's wife (Kripi) to suffer in the way that she is suffering.
	Krishna instructions to Arjuna to punish Ashwattama without killing him.

Chapter 8
	While Parikshit was still in Uttara's womb, Ashwattama tried to destroy him, so as to destroy the Pandavas’ lineage.
	Uttara prays to Krishna to protect her fetus 
	Krishna saves the Pandavas’ lineage and Uttara's fetus (Parikshit).
	Kunti praises Krishna both for His actions on earth and as the Supreme Person 
	Kunti asks Krishna to make her mind detached from material objects and become continuously absorbed in Krishna
	Krishna is about to leave for Dwaraka, but Yudhishthira stops Him, as he blames himself for the destruction caused by the war.

Chapter 9
	Krishna and the Pandavas go to Bhishma (where he is lying on the bed of arrows after the end of the Mahabharata War) so that Yudhishthira can learn about the duties of a king 
	Bhishma praises Krishna
	As Time, the Supreme Being controls all
	Krishna is only seen as the Supreme by those who Krishna allows
	Bhishma asks for complete devotion to Krishna
	Bhishma thinks of Krishna's form and actions as he sees them during the War
	Bhishma leaves his body while looking at and thinking of Krishna

Chapter 10
	Krishna leaves for Dwaraka and all the inhabitants of Hastinapura are greatly saddened that Krishna is leaving them
	Krishna's praises by the women of Hastinapura as He is leaving
	Krishna is the Supreme
	Krishna creates, upholds, and dissolves the universe as a game, but is unaffected by it
	Krishna incarnates to destroy evil
	Dwaraka has even surpassed Heaven, as Krishna is living there
	How lucky Krishna's wives are

Chapter 11
	Krishna arrives in Dwaraka
	Dwaraka is instantly enlivened when Krishna returned, as everyone there lives for Krishna
	Glories, beauties, and decorations of Dwaraka
	All the citizens of Dwaraka instant left whatever they doing and ran to meet Krishna when they heard the sound of His conch.
	Depth of love of Krishna's wives for Krishna
	Krishna welcomes each individual in the correct way, according to his/her position, age, and status

Chapter 12
	(Continuation of the incident in Chapter 8) How Krishna saves Parikshit
	Krishna enters Uttara's womb in His supreme 4-armed form scaled down to the size of a thumb, and dissipates the power of the Brahma-missile released by Ashwattama
	Parikshit (as a 10-month-old fetus) sees Krishna
	Parikshit is born due to Krishna's grace and protection
	To celebrate, Yudhishthira gave numerous valuable gifts to Brahmanas
	Brahmanas predict what Parikshit will do – both his glories in life and his death
	Parikshit is called Parikshit as he is always trying to verify that the Krishna who saved him is same as Krishna the Supreme Being

Chapter 13
Vidura learns about the Atman from Maitreya as he had gone on a pilgrimage to avoid the Mahabharata War
	Vidura returns to Hastinapura
	The Pandavas rule justly for 36 years and the citizens are content
	Vidura tells Dhritarashtra that Time (Death) is approaching
	One should not have attachment to the body and sense objects.
	The wise man renounces after all his work is completed. 
	Vidura, Dhritarashtra, and Gandhari leave for the forest silently, without letting anyone know
	Yudhishthira is depressed at the departure of Vidura, Dhritarashtra, and Gandhari
	Narada arrives and instructs Yudhishthira
	The world is controlled by the Supreme
	Time (Death) cannot be stopped
	People must follow the path created for them
	Importance of renunciation after one's work is done – do not call back one who has renounced the world

Chapter 14
	Yudhishthira sees bad omens and worries that the time for Krishna to end His incarnation has come
	Arjuna returns from Dwaraka in a greatly distressed and confused state
	Yudhishthira asks Arjuna numerous questions about the reasons for his dejection and of the well-being of people in Dwaraka

Chapter 15
	Arjuna is dejected and weak because of Krishna ending His incarnation (and thus not being there with Arjuna) and is lamenting because of His complete love of and dependence on Krishna
	Arjuna's report to Yudhishthira
	Without Krishna, Arjuna could not even defeat a small band of herdsmen.
	This life is meaningless without Krishna.
	Arjuna lists all his achievements (such as Draupadi's Swayamvara and the Mahabharata War) and how they were due to the actions and grace of Krishna alone.
	Arjuna remembers his life with Krishna, all that Krishna did for him.
	With Krishna, Arjuna could defeat everybody and have complete victory. Without Krishna, Arjuna has lost all his skills.
	Krishna has caused the Yadavas to destroy themselves in order to lighten the burden of the earth.
	Krishna is the cause of all power, achievement, and success.
	Through intense devotion, Arjuna remembered the teachings of the Geeta, and viewed himself as the Atman.
	The Pandavas renounce the Kingdom after finding out that Krishna has left and dissolve the sense of attachment with the body and the world.
	Parikshit is made King.
	The Pandavas soon become absorbed into Narayana.
	The day Krishna left His earthly form is the start of Kaliyuga (the age of sin and degradation).
	Anyone who listens to and believes this account with faith will have devotion to Krishna and be freed from the cycle of Samsara (birth and death).

Chapter 16
	Parikshit's life and glories (all of which are due to Krishna).
	Parikshit greatly enjoyed listening to the glories of Krishna, especially the story of how Krishna saved him. Parikshit gave numerous gifts to those who sang Krishna's praises and stories.
	There is no point in excess chatter about things. Time is much better spent discussing the glories of Krishna.
	Earth (in the form of a cow) and Dharma (in the form of a bull) discuss the coming of Kali, and the problems that this will bring, now that Krishna has left.
	Destruction of the family and social order.
	People will be completely attached to material life without thoughts of spirituality.
	Earth praises Krishna as having all good qualities, including those required for both spiritual progress and earthly power.
	Krishna is truth, kindness, generosity, infinite happiness, physical and mental strength, knowledge, courage, lordship, intellectual power, beauty of form, faith, and lovability.
	Without Krishna, who has all good qualities and has purified the earth, the degradation into Kaliyuga will be unrestrained.

Chapter 17
	Parikshit sees Dharma and Earth being tortured by Kaliyuga (personified).
	In Kaliyuga, the one with a stick and a loud voice (rather than knowledge and good qualities) will prevail.
	Parikshit and Dharma converse about the coming of Kaliyuga.
	Different groups have different views about what causes the enjoyments and sufferings one is undergoing.
	Some say that people decide their own futures
	Others say that the planets do this
	Others say that it is Karma
	Others say that it is Nature
	The few who understand know that everything is under the control of the Supreme Being
	Thinking about something causes the same experience as doing it.
	Parikshit captures Kali and banishes him from the kingdom. Kali can only live in 5 evil places:
	Places where people gamble excessively
	Places where people drink alcohol in an unrestrained manner
	Places of slaughter
	Places of excess, unrestrained sensual enjoyment
	Money, especially money that is unfairly obtained

Chapter 18
	Parikshit did not kill Kali as there are some great qualities of Kaliyuga
	In Kaliyuga people get rewarded for good instantly (but sins are not punished until later)
	Only incorrect actions are punishable; incorrect thoughts are not 
	Kali attacks those of weak resolve whom he can sway, but does not affect those who are genuinely good and have a strong resolve to stay on the correct path
	The Bliss of Krishna's glories is far above that of worldly enjoyments and also Heaven.
	The Ganga is the water that Brahma poured on Vishnu's feet, and has the power to purify the world because of Vishnu's powers.
	Parikshit goes to the forest and feels thirsty
	He enters a sage's ashram and asks for water.
	However, the sage does not notice as he is in deep meditation (Samadhi).
	In anger, Parikshit places a dead snake on the sage to test if he is actually in Samadhi (deep meditation) or someone pretending.
	Parikshit is cursed by the sage's son for insulting his father.
	Parikshit will be bitten by Takshaka (a very poisonous snake) within 7 days. 
	The sage reprimands his son for cursing Parikshit, stating the importance of the King for the protection of the country. 
	The sage did not feel even slightly antagonized towards Parikshit for placing the dead snake, as Holy Men are above happiness and sadness, praise and insult.

Chapter 19
	Parikshit is deeply repentant for this mistake.
	Parikshit does not mind if the curse destroys everything of his, but wants his sin to be erased and his mind never to turn against Holy Men again.
	Parikshit sees the curse as a good thing, as it will force him renounce.
	Parikshit leaves the kingdom to his son and goes to the banks of the river Ganga.
	A large number of great sages assemble and Parikshit praises them.
	The sages bless Parikshit.
	Parikshit asks the sages what he (one who knows that he is about to die in 7 days) should do.
	Sri Suka, the son of Vyasa arrives. 
	Suka Rishi is an Avadhuta (one who travels with no attachment to the body, fully absorbed in the Atman).
	Suka Rishi's body is very handsome and in perfect condition even though he does not care for it.
	Parikshit is very happy that Suka Rishi, a very great sage, has come.
	Parikshit asks Suka Rishi what he (one who knows that he is about to die) should do.

For the continuation of the Bhagavata, see Srimad Bhagavata Book 2.

References

Krishna
Puranas
Hindu texts
Vaishnava texts